Sveti Martin may refer to: 

In Croatia:
Sveti Martin na Muri, a municipality in Međimurje County
Sveti Martin, Istria County, a village in the municipality of Buzet

In Slovenia:
Dvorjane, a settlement in the Municipality of Duplek, known as Sveti Martin pri Vurbergu until 1955
Šmartno na Pohorju, a settlement in the Municipality of Slovenska Bistrica, known as Sveti Martin na Pohorju until 1952